Despoina Vavatsi (born 2 May 1978) is a Greek biathlete. She competed in two events at the 2002 Winter Olympics.

References

1978 births
Living people
Biathletes at the 2002 Winter Olympics
Greek female biathletes
Olympic biathletes of Greece
Place of birth missing (living people)
Sportspeople from Serres